Ivan Bartoš (born 25 April 1977) is a Slovak football striker who currently plays for TUS Gross St. Florian.

References

1977 births
Living people
Slovak footballers
Association football forwards
FK Dukla Banská Bystrica players
MFK Ružomberok players
SK Sigma Olomouc players
MŠK Žilina players
FC ViOn Zlaté Moravce players
FK Železiarne Podbrezová players
Slovak Super Liga players
Expatriate footballers in the Czech Republic
Slovak expatriate sportspeople in the Czech Republic
Expatriate footballers in Austria
Slovak expatriate sportspeople in Austria
Expatriate footballers in Greece
Slovak expatriate sportspeople in Greece